Sharon Fichman was the defending champion and won the title again with a 6–3, 6–2 win over Julia Glushko.

Seeds

Main draw

Finals

Top half

Bottom half

References
 Main Draw
 Qualifying Draw

Cooper Challenger
Waterloo Challenger